Haggerty is a surname. Notable people with the surname include:

Ancer L. Haggerty (born 1944), American jurist on the U.S. District Court
Ben Haggerty or Macklemore (born 1983), American rapper and musician
Dan Haggerty (1941–2016), American bodybuilder, animal trainer, and actor
Don Haggerty (1914–1988), American film actor
Frank Haggerty (1876–1962), American college sports coach
Gareth Haggerty (born 1981), British rugby league player
Isreal Haggerty (born 1969), Messianic evangelist 
James, Jim, or Jimmy Haggerty, multiple people
Joan Haggerty (born 1940), Canadian novelist
John Haggerty (disambiguation), multiple people
Mike Haggerty (born 1945), American football player
Nelson Haggerty (1973–2021), American basketball coach and player
Pat Haggerty (died 1994), American football official in the NFL
Patrick E. Haggerty (born 1914), Texas Instruments co-founder
Ray Haggerty (born 1923), Canadian politician; served in the Legislative Assembly of Ontario
Roy Haggerty (born 1966), Canadian-American scientist; professor and administrator at Oregon State University
Sam Haggerty (born 1994), American baseball player

See also
Haggerty Award, an annual college basketball award
Hagerty (disambiguation)